is a passenger railway station in located in the city of Kinokawa, Wakayama Prefecture, Japan, operated by West Japan Railway Company (JR West).

Lines
Shimoisaka Station is served by the Wakayama Line, and is located 72.0 kilometers from the terminus of the line at Ōji Station.

Station layout
The station consists of one side platform serving a single bi-directional track. There is no station building, but only a weather shelter on the platform. The station is unattended.

Adjacent stations

|-

History
Shimoisaka Station opened on July 15, 1938. With the privatization of the Japan National Railways (JNR) on April 1, 1987, the station came under the aegis of the West Japan Railway Company.

Passenger statistics
In fiscal 2019, the station was used by an average of 433 passengers daily (boarding passengers only).

Surrounding Area
Kinki University Wakayama Campus (Faculty of Biophysical Engineering)
Kii Kokubun-ji ruins

See also
List of railway stations in Japan

References

External links

 Shimoisaka Station Official Site

Railway stations in Wakayama Prefecture
Railway stations in Japan opened in 1938
Kinokawa, Wakayama